Andrew Hussey Allen (December 6, 1855 – November 15, 1921) was an American archivist and author, born in New York City. He was the son of Colonel Julian Allen, né Alschwang, and Mary Abby Hussey.  He attended Phillips Academy, Andover (Class of 1874) and graduated from Harvard University in 1878.  He studied law, and although admitted to the bar, he never engaged in practice. He worked for the United States Department of State for many years. In 1893 he was inaugurated as the Chief of the Bulletin of Rolls and Library becoming the medium for the publication of catalogues, indexes, and important papers of the national archives.

He died in Washington, D.C., on November 15, 1921.

Bibliography
 Official Relations of the United States with the Hawaiian Islands from the First Appointment of a Consular Office there by the United States Government (1893)
 Method of Recognition of Foreign Governments and Foreign States by the Government of the United States (1897)

References

1855 births
1921 deaths
American archivists
American political writers
American male non-fiction writers
Harvard University alumni
Phillips Academy alumni